Manuel "Manu" del Moral Fernández (born 25 February 1984) is a Spanish former professional footballer who played as either a forward or winger.

He played 272 games and scored 53 goals in La Liga, representing Atlético Madrid, Getafe, Sevilla, Elche and Eibar. In Segunda División, serving five other teams, he recorded 138 appearances and 29 goals.

Manu won one cap for the Spain national team.

Club career

Atlético
Manu was born in Jaén, Andalusia. After starting his youth career with local Real Jaén he finished it with Atlético Madrid, where he played alongside Braulio, and served a one-and-a-half-season loan in the second division at Recreativo de Huelva, appearing in only five matches during his first year.

While mainly registered with the capital side's reserves, Manu did play five La Liga games in the 2005–06 campaign, mainly as a late substitute.

Getafe
Manu joined Madrid neighbours Getafe CF for 2006–07, scoring his first top-flight goal on 22 October 2006 in a 2–1 victory at precisely Recreativo and finishing the season with eight (squad's second-best, behind Dani Güiza). The following campaign he teamed up again with Braulio, and netted seven times – joint-top scorer alongside Juan Ángel Albín – while also helping the Madrid outskirts team to the quarter-finals of the UEFA Cup.

The arrival of Roberto Soldado relegated del Moral to a more secondary role in 2008–09, but he still made 29 league appearances, operating mostly on the wings. On 24 January 2010, he scored the game's only goal as Getafe defeated former side Atlético Madrid for the first time at home in its history; on 7 November, after netting in a 1–3 home loss against FC Barcelona, he became the club's best-ever scorer in the top division for the second time, surpassing precisely Soldado.

On 14 March 2011, Manu scored three goals against Athletic Bilbao in only 25 minutes, one in his own net, in an eventual 2–2 home draw. He finished the season with nine goals, in a narrow escape from relegation.

Sevilla
On 23 May 2011, del Moral signed a four-year contract with Sevilla FC for €4 million. Following the departure of winger Diego Capel and the ageing of striker Frédéric Kanouté, he was immediately cast into his new team's starting XI. On 25 October, he hit an injury-time header to earn his side one point at home against Racing de Santander (2–2) – he had also opened the score late into the first half.

In late March 2012, Manu scored braces in two consecutive 3–0 away wins, first against Santander then in a local derby at Granada CF. After only three competitive goals in the 2012–13 campaign, he was loaned to Elche CF and SD Eibar, but managed just five top-tier goals both clubs combined.

Later years
On 27 August 2015, del Moral signed a one-year contract with Real Valladolid. He continued to play in the second level the following seasons, representing CD Numancia, Gimnàstic de Tarragona and CF Rayo Majadahonda.

Del Moral announced his retirement on 26 September 2019, at the age of 35.

International career
On 7 June 2011, after his best season at Getafe, del Moral made his debut for Spain, replacing David Villa during half-time of a 3–0 friendly win against Venezuela.

Career statistics

Club

Honours

Club
Getafe
Copa del Rey runner-up: 2007–08

International
Spain U20
FIFA U-20 World Cup runner-up: 2003

Spain U23
Mediterranean Games: 2005

References

External links

1984 births
Living people
Footballers from Jaén, Spain
Spanish footballers
Association football wingers
Association football forwards
La Liga players
Segunda División players
Segunda División B players
Atlético Madrid B players
Atlético Madrid footballers
Recreativo de Huelva players
Getafe CF footballers
Sevilla FC players
Elche CF players
SD Eibar footballers
Real Valladolid players
CD Numancia players
Gimnàstic de Tarragona footballers
CF Rayo Majadahonda players
Spain youth international footballers
Spain under-23 international footballers
Spain international footballers
Competitors at the 2005 Mediterranean Games
Mediterranean Games medalists in football
Mediterranean Games gold medalists for Spain